Aleksei Alekseyevich Gubochkin (born 26 January 1999) is a Russian football player who plays for FC Amkar Perm.

Club career
He made his debut in the Russian Football National League for FC Tekstilshchik Ivanovo on 1 August 2020 in a game against FC Veles Moscow, he substituted Aleksandr Shlyonkin in the 71st minute and was sent-off for a bad foul just 7 minutes later.

References

External links
 
 Profile by Russian Football National League
 

1999 births
Footballers from Moscow
Living people
Russian footballers
Association football defenders
FC Lokomotiv Moscow players
FC Saturn Ramenskoye players
FC Tekstilshchik Ivanovo players
FC Chayka Peschanokopskoye players
FC Amkar Perm players
Russian First League players
Russian Second League players